Alexander, Prince of Lippe (16 January 1831 – 13 January 1905) was the penultimate sovereign of the Principality of Lippe. Succeeding to the throne in 1895, Alexander had his power exercised by a regent throughout his reign on account of his mental illness.

Early life and ascension
Prince Alexander of Lippe was born in Detmold the seventh child of Leopold II, Lippe's reigning prince and Leopold's consort Princess Emilie of Schwarzburg-Sondershausen (1800–1867). Prince Alexander for a time served as a captain in the Hanoverian Army.

Alexander succeeded as Prince of Lippe on 20 March 1895 following the death of his brother Prince Woldemar. As Alexander had been showing signs of a mental illness and had been placed under legal restrictions in 1870 and in 1893, it was necessary for a regency to be established in Lippe. Alexander was the last male of the Lippe-Detmold line, the next senior line of the House of Lippe were the Counts of Lippe-Biesterfeld followed by the Counts of Lippe-Weissenfeld and then the most junior line the Princes of Schaumburg-Lippe.

Regency dispute
Prince Adolf of Schaumburg-Lippe, the brother-in-law of the German Emperor Wilhelm II, immediately claimed the position of regent on Alexander's ascension, basing the claim on a decree that had been issued by Prince Woldemar in 1890, but kept secret until Woldemar's death. This act was disputed by Count Ernst of Lippe-Biesterfeld who also put forward a claim to the regency. Lippe's diet confirmed Prince Adolf as regent on 24 April 1890, pending a settlement over the disputed regency.

A settlement was reached in 1897 when a commission under the presidency of King Albert of Saxony ruled in favour of the claims of Count Ernst of Lippe-Biesterfeld. Prince Adolf then resigned the regency and was replaced by Count Ernst, who would rule until his death in 1904 as regent for Alexander. Ernst's son Count Leopold of Lippe-Biesterfeld succeeded as regent.

Life as prince
While unable to exercise power Alexander lived at the sanatorium of St Gilgenberg near Bayreuth, where he would often be seen attending concerts and the theatre. He also passed time by playing chess, copying pictures from newspapers and listening to music. He was also aware of his position as a sovereign prince and would insist on royal etiquette being observed.

Alexander's death at St Gilgenberg brought about the extinction of the Lippe-Detmold line. Count Leopold of the Lippe-Biesterfeld line succeeded him as Prince of Lippe.

Ancestry

References

 

 
 
 

1831 births
1905 deaths
House of Lippe
Princes of Lippe